Lepromoris gibba is a species of beetle in the family Cerambycidae, and the only species in the genus Lepromoris. It was described by Brullé in 1838.

References

Morimopsini
Beetles described in 1838